"Looking for Me" is a song by British producer Paul Woolford and American producer Diplo, featuring vocals from American singer Kareen Lomax. It was released as a single on 24 June 2020, and has peaked at number 4 on the UK Singles Chart.

Background
Before the song came about, Lomax messaged Diplo on Instagram, with hopes to be featured on one of his productions. Paul Woolford also revealed that he was working on a collaboration with Diplo in January 2020.

The song was released through Diplo's record label, Higher Ground and features vocals by American singer Kareen Lomax.

Chart performance
"Looking for Me" first entered the UK Singles Chart top 100 in July 2020, making its debut at number 74 and reaching the top 40 in its fourth week on the chart. It took a further five weeks to make it to the top 10, during which time it also topped the UK Trending Chart. It reached its peak of four on the week dated 1 October, spending two weeks there.

Charts

Weekly charts

Year-end charts

Certifications

References

2020 singles
2020 songs
Diplo songs
Irish Singles Chart number-one singles